Carl Adolph Dahl (11 August 1769 – 3 June 1819) was a Norwegian jurist and politician. 

Carl Adolph Dahl was born at Aave in Rekefjord at Sokndal, in Rogaland, Norway.  Dahl graduated from the University of Copenhagen  in 1791. He worked as town clerk, acting magistrate and judge in Fredrikshald in Østfold. In 1795, he became acting commissioner in Fredrikshald. In 1797, he served as councilman and in 1798 judge in Tune and Veme. He also became Bailiff and town clerk in Tonsberg. In 1803, Dahl was bailiff in Fredrikshald and moved back there where he was also the judge in Idd and Marker. 

He represented Friderichshald (now Halden) at the Norwegian Constituent Assembly at Eidsvoll in 1814.
He was elected as a member of the Parliament of Norway in 1817.

Carl Adolph Dahl was married to Johanne Theodora Stang (1780-1835). They bought the Vevlen farm (Vevlen gård på Idd) in 1808. They were the grandparents of Carl Adolf Dahl (1828-1907), who was the  city engineer of Trondheim. Dahl was awarded Knighthood in the Order of the Dannebrog in 1810 and Order of the Polar Star in 1815.

References

External links
Representantene på Eidsvoll 1814 (Cappelen Damm AS)
 Men of Eidsvoll (eidsvollsmenn)

Related Reading
Holme Jørn (2014) De kom fra alle kanter - Eidsvollsmennene og deres hus  (Oslo: Cappelen Damm) 

1769 births
1819 deaths
People from Sokndal
Norwegian jurists
University of Copenhagen alumni
Order of the Polar Star
Order of the Dannebrog
Fathers of the Constitution of Norway
Members of the Storting